A public service company (or public utility company) is a corporation or other non-governmental business entity (i.e. limited partnership) which delivers public services - certain services considered essential to the public interest. The ranks of such companies include public utility companies like natural gas, pipeline, electricity, and water supply companies, sewer companies, telephone companies and telegraph companies. They also include public services such as transportation of passengers or property as a common carrier, such as airlines, railroads, trucking, bus, and taxicab companies.

Public service (or utility) companies may operate under certificates of public convenience and necessity which may limit competition. Their services may be subject to rate control and other regulations which are not common to general businesses.

The concept of public service companies was that, in order to attract sufficient private investment capital and guarantee sufficient revenues to ensure appropriate operations and services, protection from ruinous competition and additional governmental oversight of rates and services were required to balance the needs of the owners of the business with those of the general public.

Under concepts of deregulation, many principles under which public service companies have long operated are negated and replaced by those of a competitive market.

In the United States, at an interstate level, most airlines, railroad, and trucking and bus transportation services were deregulated in the last quarter of the 20th century. Many of the changes in the laws at the federal level had the effect of deregulation or substantially weakened similar state and local laws regarding the same services.

See also 
 Airline Deregulation Act (1977)
 Staggers Rail Act (1980)
 National Gas Policy Act (1980)
 Motor Carrier Act (1980)
 Bus Regulatory Reform Act (1982)
 Natural Gas Wellhead Decontrol Act (1989)
 National Energy Policy Act (1992)
 Telecommunications Act of 1996

References
Code of Virginia, Title 56.1 Public Service Companies

Civil law (common law)
Legal terminology
Public services